A lesbian rule was historically a flexible mason's rule made of lead that could be bent to the curves of a molding, and used to measure or reproduce irregular curves.  Lesbian rules were originally constructed of a pliable kind of lead found on the island of Lesbos.

Figurative allusions
The rule is alluded to by Aristotle in his Nicomachean Ethics (book V, chapter 10) as a metaphor for the importance of flexibility in equitable justice:

In the early modern period the term was often used figuratively (as Aristotle had used it) to mean a pliant, flexible and accommodating principle of judgment – sometimes with overtones that were positive, but on other occasions in a more pejorative sense. In his famous letter to the Louvain theologian Martin Dorp, Thomas More referenced it when reproving Dorp for his attack on Erasmus' In Praise of Folly: "You praise Adriaan for being unbiased, yet you seem to suggest he is no more unbiased than a Lesbian rule, a rule made out of lead which, as Aristotle reminds us, is not always unbiased, since it bends to fit uneven shapes." Samuel Daniel in 1603 described equity as "that Lesbian square, that building fit, Plies to the worke, not forc'th the worke to it".

In the later 17th century, the antiquary John Aubrey used the metaphor to imply the distortion of evidence to fit a preconceived theory. He accused Inigo Jones, who had interpreted Stonehenge as a Roman monument, of having "made a Lesbians rule, which is conformed to the stone: that is, he framed the Monument to his own Hypothesis, which is much differing from the Thing it self". 

In Giambattista Vico's 1708 oration De nostri temporis studiorum ratione, a contribution to the evolving public debate about the advantages and disadvantages of the early modern academic system compared to that of the classical period (the "Quarrel of the Ancients and the Moderns"), Vico invokes the notion of the Lesbian rule to describe what is lacking in the modern system's intense focus on the mechanistic precision of the developing natural sciences:

In the 19th century, John Henry Newman invokes the Lesbian rule in the introduction to Part I of his Essay on the Development of Christian Doctrine (1845).

See also

References 

Masonry
Stonemasonry tools
Technical drawing tools
Tools
Length, distance, or range measuring devices